The 1971 European Formula Two season was contested over 11 rounds. March Engineering driver Ronnie Peterson clinched the championship title.

Teams and drivers

Calendar

Note:

Race 1, 7, 8 and 10 were held in two heats, with results shown in aggregate.

Race 2, 5 and 6 were held with two semi-final heats and the final run, with time only shown for the final.

Race 2, 4, 5 and 9 was won by a graded driver, all graded drivers are shown in Italics.

Final point standings

Driver

For every race points were awarded: 9 points to the winner, 6 for runner-up, 4 for third place, 3 for fourth place, 2 for fifth place and 1 for sixth place. No additional points were awarded. The best 8 results count. No driver had a point deduction.

Note:

Only drivers which were not graded were able to score points.

References

Formula Two
European Formula Two Championship seasons